Yang Ying (born 1953) is a retired Chinese international table tennis player.

Table tennis career
She won the 1977 World Table Tennis Championships in women's doubles, partnering with North Korean player Pak Yong-ok. In the 1978 Asian Table Tennis Championships, she won a silver in women's singles and a gold in team competition. In the 1978 Asian Games, she won a bronze in women's doubles (partnering with Cao Yanhua) and a gold in team competition.

Later she played in Germany's Bundesliga for DSC Kaiserberg, helping the club win the 1980–1981 season as well as the 1981 ETTU Cup.

Retirement
After retirement she coached the German club ATSV Saarbrücken, and is currently the head coach of the Saarland Table Tennis Association.

See also
 List of table tennis players
 List of World Table Tennis Championships medalists

References

 YANG Ying 1 (CHN) - ITTF Database

1953 births
Living people
Chinese female table tennis players
Sportspeople from Chongqing
Asian Games medalists in table tennis
Chinese expatriates in Germany
Asian Games gold medalists for China
Asian Games bronze medalists for China
Medalists at the 1978 Asian Games
Table tennis players from Chongqing
Table tennis players at the 1978 Asian Games